Dorjiin Enkhbaatar (born 27 November 1953) is a Mongolian weightlifter. He competed in the men's flyweight event at the 1980 Summer Olympics.

References

1953 births
Living people
Mongolian male weightlifters
Olympic weightlifters of Mongolia
Weightlifters at the 1980 Summer Olympics
Place of birth missing (living people)
20th-century Mongolian people